The name candelabra primula or candelabra primrose refers to species and cultivars of Primula section Proliferae (formerly Candelabra), originating mainly in the far east. They are characterised by whorls of flowers formed in circles at intervals around strong vertical stems, in many brilliant colours, flowering over a long period from Spring to Summer. They are popular ornamental subjects for moist, heavy, neutral or acidic soil. They associate well with other plants, such as rhododendrons, which enjoy similar conditions.

Primula aurantiaca
Primula bulleyana (including Primula beesiana)
Primula burmanica
Primula chungensis
Primula cockburniana
Primula cooperi
Primula japonica
Primula mallophylla
Primula melanodonta
Primula miyabeana
Primula poissonii
Primula polonensis
Primula prenantha
Primula prolifera (including Primula helodoxa)
Primula pulverulenta
Primula secundiflora
Primula serratifolia
Primula stenodonta
Primula wilsonii

References

Primula
Plant sections